Bengin Ahmad (Arabic: بنكين أحمد ; Kurdish: Bengîn Ehmed; born June 10, 1986) is a Syrian Kurdish photographer and creative director, known for his candid photographs of Horse & Equine, Architecture and also Portrait. He is the first Syrian and the first Kurdish who obtains a Crown Distinction at the Global Photographic Union (GPU).

Biography 

Bengin Ahmad was born on June 10, 1986, in Aleppo city in a Kurdish family, where he had the opportunity to explore the arts of diverse ethnicities and cultures of Aleppo people and Syrians. These aesthetic inspirations created his passion for digital art, graphic design, animation and filmmaking in addition to photography. He studied Geological Sciences at The University of Aleppo before moving to Dubai, United Arab Emirates where he worked as a creative director and continued his studies in Business Management. Since 2011 he has lived and worked both in Germany and Dubai, United Arab Emirates.

Photography 

In 2007, Bengin has started his journey in photography. Aleppo's old streets, the city's citadel and people's portraits from different Syrian ethnicities were his first photography subjects.

In 2009, he held his first solo photography exhibition in Aleppo. Since then he has participated in many international photography exhibitions and contests where he achieved various awards and became an international award-winning photographer, and obtained the Crown 1 distinction from the Global Photographic Union – GPU.

His works have also been published in many international art magazines, newspapers and online media, such as ABC News, The London Magazine, HuffPost, United Nations Regional Information Centre (UNIRC), BBC, Reason, Samsung C&T Corporation, ArchDaily and more.

Art philosophy 

Bengin considers that art and knowledge completing each other and this is the foundation of his designs and artworks including photography. He believes that innate knowledge can explain stories, that can't be told with words nor with human collective experiences, however, the acquired knowledge can enrich the interpretation of the artworks and share deeper stories.

He believes that photographic rules & themes are a great starting point, but he always aims to break those rules with creativity. He uses the example of someone trying to learn writing with a pen on a paper, but by patience and experience, the creativity can lead to calligraphy that breaks many rules and introduces wonderful artworks.

As Bengin's passion about composing music, he assumes photography themes as different music genres, like someone who knows how to play different kinds, but some of those genres are close to his heart.

Equine photography 

One of the most potent topics in Bengin's photography is equine photography. He travels to countries and places where horses are breaded and taken care of, such as UAE, Germany, Kurdistan of Iraq, Luxembourg, France to capture his desired shots.

He also delivers lectures and workshops on equine and horse photography, focusing on horses' characteristics, tips and tricks within the technicalities of photographing them and creating a story around the artwork.

He mostly captures horses without tack, halters, saddle or any accessory, as he believes that "freedom" is one of the most prominent characteristics of horses, hence, he releases them to capture them in their fullest freedom.

People, portraits and street photography 

Bengin sees portraits in two directions. The first one is about the general and common characteristics of ethnic groups or a lifestyle or certain Ideology believers. There is a single link that connects every group; either through psychology, philosophy or lifestyle. The long hair and beard of Sikh men, Yazidi men's extra-long mustaches, the intense gaze of Arab Bedouins, or the female followers of a certain fashion trend are all among this group.

The second direction digs deeper by focusing on individuals' unique features that distinguish them from the rest. To create his desired artworks in this realm, he uses various framing, cropping and editing techniques to emphasize certain individualities in the photo. He finds hope and peace in the eyes of ordinary people, or within the wrinkles of the old ones. He believes these qualities create the most beautiful portraits.

"A Syrian Refugee" is one of the most prominent portraits by Bengin, and widely published by many magazines and websites such as UNIRC, which is United Nations entity, ABC News, The London Magazine, HuffPost, Humanium and many more.

Memberships 

 International Federation of Photographic Art (FIAP)
 Global Photographic Union (GPU)
 The Photographic Society of America (PSA)
 Union of Arab Photographers (UAP)
 Gulf Photographic Center (GPC)

Awards and distinctions 

 GPU Crown 1 Distinction (Global Photographic Union)
 Gold Medal of Photographic Society of America (Indian Continental Circuit, 2018)
 Gold Medal of Photographic Society of America (Indian Royal International Digital Circuit, 2018)
 Silver Medal of IRC (Indian Royal International Digital Circuit, 2018)
 Bronze medal Gradac PGI (9th International Salon of Photography Cacak, 2019)
 Honorable Mention of Fédération Internationale de l'Art Photographique – FIAP (Vintage Circuit, 2018)
 Honorable Mention of the Association of Slovak Photographers – ZSF (33-th photosalon STROM 2018)
 Honorable Mention of Gradac PGI (3rd International Circular of Photography Grand M.S.M. 2018)
 Honorable Mention – Salon Kolasin (4th Circular Exhibition of Photography "TOUR CIRCUIT 2018")
 Honorable mention of PC Perasto (9th International Salon of Photography Cacak 2019)

Gallery 
Bengin Ahmad's other photography works are as follows:

References

External links 
 
 Bengin Ahmad – G.P.U. Page
 

1986 births
Syrian Kurdish people
Kurdish male artists
Syrian artists
Syrian male artists
Syrian photographers
People from Aleppo
Syrian designers
Living people